Calico Bush is a children's historical novel by Newbery-award-winning author Rachel Field. Considered by some to be her best novel,  it was first published in 1931 and received a Newbery Honor award.

Plot

Calico Bush is set on the Maine coast in the pioneer era, and tells the story of Marguerite, a young French orphan who becomes an indentured servant on a farm.

Background

Field spent the 1920s summering on Sutton Island, part of Cranberry Isles, Maine.
According to Margaret Lane, "The inspiration for Calico Bush probably came from the story of Marguerite La Croix, who with her husband, John Stanley, moved from Marblehead after 1767, with their many children and became the first permanent residents of Little Cranberry Island. Just north of the 'Head' their hearthstones still lie undisturbed in the field, and they themselves are buried on Maypole Point." Field did not try to tell the woman's story exactly, but used her as inspiration for her book.

The name Calico Bush is used for a Mountain Laurel native to the eastern United States, including Maine. It is also the title of a ballad referred to in the book.

Critical reception

Besides receiving the Newbery Honor Award for 1932, Calico Bush was well received by critics. Saturday Review called it "a really good book, simple in its narrative, meaty, sincere". According to The New York Times, "Adult readers as well as boys and girls will be grateful to Rachel Field for this fine and absorbing tale."  
 
Decades later the book was still well-regarded. Children's literature expert May Hill Arbuthnot called Calico Bush "unusual and powerful" It is, she said, a "model of sound historical fiction. The picture of the times and the people is not only authentic but unusually balanced."

See also
 Hitty, Her First Hundred Years

References

1931 American novels
American children's novels
Children's historical novels
Newbery Honor-winning works
Novels set in Maine
Novels about orphans
1931 children's books